Alpha Waves is a 1990 3D game that combines labyrinthine exploration with platform gameplay. It combined for the first time full-screen, six-axis, flat-shaded 3D with 3D object interaction (like bouncing on a platform). Alpha Waves was an abstract game with a moody, artistic presentation, named for its supposed ability to stimulate the different emotional centers of the brain with its use of color and music. The game was awarded the Guinness Book of Records title for First 3D platform game
 

It was developed initially for the Atari ST by Christophe de Dinechin, and later ported to the Amiga and DOS. The DOS port was done by Frédérick Raynal, a notable game designer who would go on to develop Alone in the Dark and Little Big Adventure. He has said that his work on Alpha Waves was a major inspiration for the 3D engine for Alone in the Dark. The PC version was also localized in North America by Data East, and retitled Continuum. Infogrames may have also published their own version in the US under the original title, and it was also released as a part of no less than two Infogrames compilations, on which it retained its original name.

In November 2012, Christophe de Dinechin released the complete assembly language and GFA BASIC development tools source code for the Atari ST version. There is also a started PC port in C++ on SourceForge by the original author.

Mechanics
Alpha Waves features two main modes of play: Action and Emotion. The core gameplay in both is the same.

In emotion mode, players guide one of six crafts (which are little more than geometric shapes in many cases) onto trampoline-like platforms. On these platforms, the player bounces automatically, higher, with each jump, until he reaches the maximum height possible for that platform (some are stronger than others). Every room in the game is a cube, and the walls contain doorways leading to other rooms. In this way, players have to work their way through the game's rooms, and reach different areas based on different emotions.

In Action Mode, players also work against the clock. Time bonuses are awarded for entering new rooms, and keys can be collected to open new paths. There is not a particular end to the game, but the goal is simply to last as long and to discover as much as possible before time runs out. Emotion Mode allows players to explore without time constraints, but players are not allowed to cross certain game boundaries.

Emotion mode was not time limited, and allowed players to explore the game environment freely. While completing the game in Action Mode was very difficult, many players simply enjoyed exploring the game territory in Emotion Mode.

Version differences
Alpha Waves was initially released on the Atari ST. This version is notable for allowing two players to compete simultaneously. It lacked music entirely on the Atari 520ST, because of insufficient memory to store the music samples. On Atari 1040ST and later models, the theme song played during the intro. The music was stored on the second side of the floppy disk, since any Atari ST with enough memory also had a dual-sided floppy drive. A promotional version of the program was distributed by a French magazine on single-sided floppy disks, crashing any machine with more than 512K of memory.

The Amiga port was second and added a theme song at the title screen. The interface is similar, but the zone select in Emotion has been redone. Beyond this, it is very similar to the original - including the retention of the split-screen two player mode.

The DOS version was the last one, and contains a number of improvements. This version supported AdLib/SoundBlaster sound cards. The soundtrack was also expanded to play in-game, and each zone had its own music. Additionally some of the mobiles have been changed, level layouts tweaked, and the camera tilting toned down for easier viewing. The menus and level selection screen have been redone again, and are noticeably enhanced. The DOS version also includes a two player Action Mode (turn-based as opposed to the split-screen of the other two versions).

The DOS version lacks a mechanism to regulate speed when played on systems faster than it was intended for (essentially causing it to play in fast forward on newer hardware). However, when played on a properly configured system or emulator, this can offer the highest frame rate and most reactive controls, for solo play especially.

Technology

Other 3D games of the same era include various ports of Elite (1984-1991), Falcon (1987), Driller (1987),  Starglider 2 (1988), and Hovertank 3D (1991). Alpha-Waves (1990) brought a number of innovations to the 3D gaming experience that make it a significant landmark in 3D gaming:
 Depth-of-field clipping (objects disappearing in the distance)
 Large (for the time) number of 3D objects displayed simultaneously
 First simultaneous two-player split-screen mode on a single computer (only on the Atari ST and Amiga versions)

Alpha Waves ran on 16-bit microcomputers that did not have hardware floating-point capabilities. For that reason, it performed all perspective and rotation computations using only integer arithmetics. In order to avoid using integer multiplications, which were expensive at the time, it described objects using displacements that were multiples of a base vector. For instance, a square in the Z plane would have been described as "+1X +1Y -1X -1Y". As a result, the vast majority of geometric computations were performed using only additions, not multiplications.

The computation of sine and cosines was similarly done using only integer arithmetic. All angles were represented using not degrees, but 1/256 of a circle. A lookup table contained the value of the sine multiplied by 32767. Multiplying this value by a 16-bit coordinate gave a 32-bit value, and the 16-bit high-half of that result was used.

The Atari ST and Amiga versions were written in assembly language. The DOS version was written in C.

Reception 

Computer Gaming World stated that the game "plays like one would expect a Star Trek: The Next Generation "holodeck" game to play". The magazine said that it offered "some fascinating game experiences", but the lack of combat or two-player modem racing—and goals so uninteresting that they "actually detract from the game"—caused it to "fall short in the most important department of lasting entertainment".

The One gave the DOS version of Alpha Waves an overall score of 80%, calling it the "most abstract and original" game of Infogrames' Crystal Collection, and begins their review by noting that "Alpha Waves'  effect is so dependent on colour and sound that you really do need a fast VGA machine with an AdLib sound card to get the most out of it. However, even with all the suitable hardware Alpha Waves doesn't have much of a lasting appeal." The One furthermore expresses that "It's quite an entertaining way to spend a few hours, but the problem is that as nice as the idea is there simply isn't enough variety to sustain interest. After a few weeks play the only state of mind that Alpha Waves will induce is boredom." In regards to Alpha Waves proposed psychological aspect, The One states that "Whether the light and sound frequencies actually do have some effect is difficult to tell - certainly no-one here noticed any difference." Despite these criticisms, The One praises Alpha Waves as "very original", and also praises its soundtrack as "simple but effective".

References

External links
Alpha Waves for the Amiga at The Hall of Light
History of Alpha Waves

1990 video games
3D platform games
Amiga games
Atari ST games
Commercial video games with freely available source code
DOS games
Assembly language software
Video games developed in France